Zone 72 is a zone in the municipality of Al-Shahaniya in the state of Qatar. The main district recorded in the 2015 population census was Al Utouriya. 

Other districts which fall within its administrative boundaries are Lehsain, Qaryat Al Refaiq, Ras Abrouq, Umm Al Daah Khawzan, Umm Al Qahab Al Jadeeda, Umm Al Qahab Al Qadeema, Umm Leghab West, Wadi Laswaq, and Zekreet.

Demographics
As of the 2010 census, the zone comprised 363 housing units and 123 establishments. There were 1,060 people living in the zone, of which 72% were male and 28% were female. Out of the 1,060 inhabitants, 80% were 20 years of age or older and 20% were under the age of 20.

Employed persons made up 72% of the total population. Females accounted for 19% of the working population, while males accounted for 81% of the working population. Most of the working population is employed within the agricultural industry (356), and public administration and defense comes in second with 110 employed individuals.

Land use
The Ministry of Municipality and Environment (MME) breaks down land use in the zone as follows.

References 

Zones of Qatar
Al-Shahaniya